Sougères-en-Puisaye (literally Sougères in Puisaye) is a commune in the Yonne department in Bourgogne-Franche-Comté in north-central France, in the natural region of Forterre - even though its name refers to neighboring Puisaye.

Inhabitants are "Sougérois" and "Sougéroise".

Geography 
Sougères-en-Puisaye has few hamlets: "Les Simons" (close to the village), "Chauminet", "Pesselières", "Les Billards" and "Les Roches".

See also
Communes of the Yonne department

References

External links 

 Official Website

Communes of Yonne